The Alamein line is a commuter railway line in the city of Melbourne, Victoria, Australia. The line runs from Flinders Street station in central Melbourne to Alamein station in the east, serving 18 stations via Burnley, Camberwell, Riversdale, and Ashburton. The line operates for approximately 19 hours a day (from approximately 5:00 am to around 12:00 am) with 24 hour service available on Friday and Saturday nights. During peak hour, headways of up to 15 minutes are operated with services every 10-30 minutes during off-peak hours. Trains on the Alamein line run with one or two three-car formations of X'Trapolis 100 trainsets.

Sections of the Alamein line opened as early as 1898, with the line fully extended to Alamein by 1948. The Alamein line was originally part of the Outer Circle line which operated from 1890 till its closure in 1897. The line was built to connect Melbourne with the suburbs towns of Camberwell and Ashburton, amongst others previously served by the Outer Circle line. Minor upgrades have occurred since its opening, including historical level crossing removal works and regular infrastructure upgrades.

History

19th century 

What is now known as the Alamein line was opened as the Outer Circle Railway between 1890 and 1891. The segment still in use today was opened on 24 March 1890.

20th century 

The section from Camberwell to Ashburton was reopened 4 July 1898 and was operated by a steam locomotive and single carriage. The northern section, from Riversdale to Deepdene, was reopened on 14 May 1900, with a steam train, known locally as the Deepdene Dasher, running between Ashburton and Deepdene at ~90-minute intervals, connecting at East Camberwell on the lower platform. The Deepdene Dasher was the last passenger steam train in suburban Melbourne.

Electrification of the Melbourne suburban rail network commenced in the 1920s. In 1923, the Railway Commissioners decided not to electrify the line from Deepdene through Riversdale to Ashburton, due to insufficient traffic levels, but would keep the issue under review. Their position was partly reversed, with the Camberwell to Ashburton section later being included in the project. The last steam train ran to Ashburton on 29 October 1924 with electric train services commencing three days later in the form of shuttle trains from Camberwell to Ashburton, running every 40 minutes. On 15 August 1926, the last steam train the Deepdene Dasher ran, and was replaced by a pair of AEC railmotors coupled back to back. The Commissioners intended to electrify the line if the volume of traffic increased, but that did not occur, and the service was replaced by road bus on 10 October 1927. The electrified suburban service remains as today's Alamein line.

The line from Camberwell to the terminus was single line with no crossing loops provided. The single train running operated a shuttle service along the line from Camberwell. Staff and Ticket safeworking was used, except between Camberwell and Riversdale where Lever Locking & Track Control was provided on 2 November 1924. Patronage and revenue on the line doubled after electrification, and on 12 October 1925 a 30 to 45 minute connecting service was provided to Ashburton. From 26 November 1928 two trains were provided at peak hours, with a new crossing loop provided at Hartwell. Through trains to the city at peak hour were provided from 17 May 1934. From 3 October 1938 the daytime off peak frequency was improved to 15 minutes.

On 28 June 1948, the line was extended to the new Housing Commission of Victoria estate of Alamein, with some services extended to the new terminus. After World War II, as part of Operation Phoenix, plans were drawn up to duplicate the line and provide a flying junction connection at Camberwell. It was authorised in 1951, but was delayed due to funding issues and other competing projects. From 15 July 1955, Ashburton station ceased to be a regular terminus. However, reduced loan funds for railway construction during 1955 and 1956 delayed the rest of the works, with the overpass and new line at Camberwell finally commissioned on 29 November 1959. The last stage of the works had to wait until 8 November 1962 when automatic signalling was introduced between Hartwell and Ashburton, and the signal bay at Hartwell closed.

In 1986, a one car Tait train took over the service on Sundays, with the train guard selling tickets as station staff were withdrawn from every station except Ashburton, which remained open for safeworking reasons. From 9 July 1972, the service was cut to every hour on Sundays, and from 10 December 1973 it was changed to 20 minutes during the day and every 40 minutes at night and on Saturday afternoons. Through trains to Flinders Street off-peak were provided from 20 January 1975 at a frequency of every 15 minutes Monday to Friday, with Box Hill trains running express from Camberwell.

Moves were made to close the line or convert it to light rail in the 1980s, as well as plans under the Kennett government to close the line in the early 1990s. However, the Alamein line has remained open well into the 21st century.

21st century 
The 2000s saw the introduction of the X'Trapolis 100 rolling stock on the line. The new stock features three doors per side on each carriage with the ability accommodate up to 432 seated passengers in each six car configuration.

In 2021, the metropolitan timetable underwent a major rewrite, resulting in all Alamein line trains operating via the City Loop (during peak hours) alongside Belgrave, Glen Waverley, and Lilydale services. Outside peak hours, the Alamein line operates as a shuttle service to Camberwell.

Network and operations

Services 
Services on the Alamein line operates from approximately 5:00 am to around 12:00 am daily. In general, during peak hours, train frequency is 10-20 minutes while services during non-peak hours drops to 20–30 minutes throughout the entire route. Due to the limited number of passengers on the Alamein line, services operate as a shuttle in off-peak times to Camberwell instead of continuing into the CBD. On Friday nights and weekends, services run 24 hours a day, with 60 minute frequencies available outside of normal operating hours.

Train services on the Alamein line are also subjected to maintenance and renewal works, usually on selected Fridays and Saturdays. Shuttle bus services are provided throughout the duration of works for affected commuters.

Stopping patterns 
Legend — Station status
 ◼ Premium Station – Station staffed from first to last train
 ◻ Host Station – Usually staffed during morning peak, however this can vary for different stations on the network.

Legend — Stopping patternsSome services do not operate via the City Loop
 ● – All trains stop
 ◐ – Some services do not stop
 ▲ – Only inbound trains stop
 | – Trains pass and do not stop

Operators 
The Alamein line has had a total of 6 operators since its opening in 1898. The majority of operations throughout its history have been government run: from its first service in 1898 until the 1997 privatisation of Melbourne's rail network, three different government operators have run the line. These operators, Victorian Railways, the Metropolitan Transit Authority, and the Public Transport Corporation have a combined operational length of 99 years. In comparison, the three private operators, Hillside Trains, Connex Melbourne, and Metro Trains Melbourne have had a combined operational period of  years.

Route 

The Alamein line forms a relatively straight route from the Melbourne central business district to its terminus in Alamein. After Ashburton, the line is narrowed to a single track which remains till its terminus in Alamein. After departing from its terminus at Flinders Street, the Alamein line traverses gentle hills with moderately heavy earthworks for most of the line. Some sections of the line have been elevated or lowered into a cutting to eliminate level crossings. There are two level crossings remaining on the line with no current plans to remove them. 

The line follows the same alignment as the Belgrave, Glen Waverley, and Lilydale lines with the Glen Waverley line splitting off after Burnley and the three remaining services splitting off at Camberwell. The Alamein line continues on its southern alignment, whereas the Belgrave, and Lilydale lines takes an eastern alignment towards their final destinations. All of the rail line goes through built-up suburbs towards its terminus in Alamein.

Stations 
The line serves 18 stations across  of track. The stations are a mix of elevated, lowered, underground, and ground level designs. Underground stations are present only in the City Loop, with the majority of elevated and lowered stations being constructed as part of level crossing removals.

Infrastructure

Rolling stock 
The Alamein line uses X'Trapolis 100 electric multiple unit (EMU) trains operating in a one or two three-car configuration, with three doors per side on each carriage and can accommodate of up to 432 seated passengers in each six car configuration. The trains were originally built between 2002 and 2004 as well as between 2009 and 2020 with a total of 212 three-car sets constructed. The trains are shared with 7 other metropolitan train lines and have been in service since 2003.

Alongside the passenger trains, Alamein line tracks and equipment are maintained by a fleet of engineering trains. The four types of engineering trains are: the shunting train; designed for moving trains along non-electrified corridors and for transporting other maintenance locomotives, for track evaluation; designed for evaluating track and its condition, the overhead inspection train; designed for overhead wiring inspection, and the infrastructure evaluation carriage designed for general infrastructure evaluation. Most of these trains are repurposed locomotives previously used by V/Line, Metro Trains, and the Southern Shorthaul Railroad.

Accessibility 
In compliance with the Disability Discrimination Act of 1992, all stations that are new-built or rebuilt are fully accessible and comply with these guidelines. Less than half of stations on the corridor are fully accessible as they haven't been upgraded to meet these guidelines. These stations do feature ramps, however, they have a gradient greater than 1 in 14. Stations that are fully accessible feature ramps that have a gradient less than 1 in 14, have at-grade paths, or feature lifts. These stations typically also feature tactile boarding indicators, independent boarding ramps, wheelchair accessible myki barriers, hearing loops, and widened paths.

Individual station upgrade projects have helped improve station accessibility on the line, however, only 40% of stations on the line are fully wheelchair accessible. Future station upgrade projects will continue to increase the number of fully accessible stations overtime.

Signalling 
The Alamein line uses three position signalling which is used across the Melbourne train network. Three position signalling was first introduced on the line in 1919, with the final section to Ashburton converted to the new type of signalling in 1962. Since Ashburton and Alamein staions are very close to each other, the single track between the two stations uses station limits working.

References

External links
 Alamein line timetable
 Network map
 

Railway lines in Melbourne
Railway lines opened in 1891
1891 establishments in Australia
Public transport routes in the City of Melbourne (LGA)
Transport in the City of Yarra
Transport in the City of Boroondara